Rheinmünster is a municipality in the district of Rastatt in Baden-Württemberg in Germany. Formed in 1974, the town is an amalgamation of the former independent councils of Greffern, Schwarzach and Stollhofen. The name comes from the Rhine (Rhein), the river neighbouring the town and the cathedral (Münster), a Benedictine abbey that fell to secularisation in 1803.

References

Rastatt (district)